The P-38 (larger variant known as the P-51) is a small can opener that was issued with canned United States military rations from its introduction in 1942 to the end of canned ration issuance in the 1980s. Originally designed for and distributed in the K-ration, it was later included in the C-ration. As of 2020, it is still in production and sold worldwide.

Design 

The P-38 is known as a "John Wayne" by the United States Marine Corps, because of its toughness and dependability.

A notch just under the hinge point keeps the opener hooked around the rim of the can as the device is "walked" around to cut the lid out. A larger version called the P-51 is somewhat easier to operate. The handle portion can also double as a makeshift flat-blade screwdriver, with limited ability because of the rather soft sheet metal used.

Official military designations for the P-38 include "US ARMY POCKET CAN OPENER" and "OPENER, CAN, HAND, FOLDING, TYPE I". As with some other military terms (e.g., "jeep"), the origin of the term is not known with certainty. The P-38 opener coincidentally shares a designation with the Lockheed P-38 Lightning fighter plane, which could allude to its fast performance; additionally the P-51 can opener also has an aircraft namesake in the North American P-51 Mustang.

One explanation for the origin of the name is that the P-38 is approximately 38 millimeters long. However, use of the metric system in the US was not widespread at this point, and United States Army sources indicate that the origin of the name is rooted in the 38 punctures around the circumference of a C-ration can required for opening.

P-38s are no longer used for individual rations by the U.S. military, as canned C-rations were replaced by MRE rations in the 1980s, packed in plastic pouches. The larger P-51s are included with United States military "Tray Rations" (canned bulk meals). They are also still seen in disaster recovery efforts and have been handed out alongside canned food by rescue organizations, both in the U.S. and abroad.

The original U.S.-contract P-38 can openers were manufactured by J.W. Speaker Corporation of Germantown, Wisconsin (stamped "Speaker USA") and by Washburn Corporation (marked "US Androck"); they were later made by Mallin Shelby Hardware inc  (defunct 1973) of Shelby, Ohio and were variously stamped "US Mallin Shelby O." or "U.S. Shelby Co."

Advantages 
The P-38 is cheaper to manufacture than a standard can opener, and is smaller and lighter to carry. The device can be easily attached to a keychain or dog tag chain using the small punched hole.

Usage 

The P-38 is easily used.  First, the cutting point is pivoted to its 95-degree position, from its stowed, folded position.  Then, for a right-handed user, the P-38 is held in the right hand by the flat long section, with the cutting point pointing downward and away from the user, while also hooking the edge of the can through the circular notch located on the flat long section next to the cutting edge.  The can is held in the left hand, and the right hand is rotated slightly clockwise, causing the can lid to be punctured.  

The can is then rotated counter-clockwise in the left hand, while the right hand rotates alternatively slightly counter-clockwise and slightly clockwise, until the can has been rotated nearly 360 degrees and the lid is nearly free.  The lid of the now opened can is lifted, most often with the P-38 cutting edge, and the P-38 is wiped clean, and the cutting point is rotated back to its stowed, folded position. The P-38 is then returned to its stored location, whether that is dangling on a dog tag chain around one's neck, or in one's pocket if the P-38 is attached to a key ring.  

Left-handed users simply hold the P-38 in their left hand, with the cutting point aimed towards themselves, while holding the can to be opened in their right hand, while also reversing the sense of the cutting hand movements just described.  By tradition, 38 cuts as just described were supposedly required to open a can of C-Rations.

A left-handed user is at a slight disadvantage in that the tip of the thumb (instead of the lateral flank of the distal index finger) must apply the combined travel & twist forces.  Righties' thumbs take only the twist force.

Similar devices 

A similar device that incorporates a small spoon at one end and a bottle opener at the other is currently employed by the Australian Defence Force and New Zealand Army in its ration kits. The Field Ration Eating Device is  known by the acronym "FRED". It is also known widely in its derogative backronym, the "Fucking Ridiculous Eating Device".

Another similar device was included with British Army "Operational Ration Pack, General Purpose" 24-hour ration pack and "Compo" Composite (14 man) Ration pack rations. At one stage they were manufactured by W.P. Warren Engineering Co. Ltd, Birmingham, England.  The instructions printed on the miniature greaseproof paper bag they were supplied in read:

TO OPEN CAN:
Place opener on the can with rim of can inside the slot. Hold between thumb and forefinger and twist forward to puncture. Repeat motion until can is open. 

It takes approximately 38 twists to fully open a C-ration can. Their design is similar, but not identical, to the P-38 and P-51 can openers.

The Swedish army also employed a similar variant of this opener. Its official designation is M7481-021000 Konservbrytare Mini which was distributed with the notorious "Golden Cans" (Swedish field rations were packaged in metallic tins with a golden hue). In 1924, a similar device was featured in Popular Mechanics, with no mention of a military provenance.

An opener similar to the P-38, but with a non-folding blade, was popular in Poland for years. It can still be found in shops as well as the butterfly-type openers.

See also 
 Church key

References

External links 
 Video Demonstration of various P-38 Can Openers

Food preparation utensils
Military equipment of the United States
Military food of the United States